Teryn Ashley-Fitch (born December 12, 1978) is an American former professional tennis player. She won 17 titles in her career, four in singles (all ITF). In July 2004, she reached her highest singles ranking of world No. 95. Her career-high doubles ranking is 59, achieved in October 2003.

Career
Ashley played her first match at an ITF event in San Antonio, Texas on 8 January 1996, losing in the second qualifying round to Tu Dong.

Her best Grand Slam result came at the 2004 Wimbledon Championships, where she defeated Tina Pisnik to enter the second round, where she was overpowered by 27th seeded Alicia Molik.

At the Auckland Open held in New Zealand in 2003, Teryn won her only WTA Tour title, playing alongside Abigail Spears to beat Cara Black and Elena Likhovtseva in the final.

Ashley also won the Dow Tennis Classic doubles event with Abigail Spears held 2003 in Midland, Michigan, which was her biggest ITF Women's Circuit title, beating Bethanie Mattek and Shenay Perry in the final.

At the 2002 US Open, Ashley partnered Sarah Taylor to reach the second round of the doubles draw, defeating Laura Montalvo and Elena Tatarkova, 6–4, 4–6, 6–4.

In Paris at the 2003 French Open, she paired-up with Spears to beat Renata Voráčová and Marlene Weingärtner to reach the second round.

At the 2003 US Open, she paired-up again with Spears to beat Bianka Lamade and Anastasia Myskina in three sets to reach round two for the second consecutive year.

In her career overall, she won one WTA doubles title, four ITF singles and twelve ITF doubles titles. She enjoyed a successful doubles partnership with compatriot Abigail Spears.

Teryn retired from tennis in January 2006, after losing in the first round of singles and doubles at a $25k event in Tampa, Florida. She lost her singles match to Tatjana Malek.

Personal life
Teryn was born and raised by parents Allen and Anne in Boston, Massachusetts. She was introduced to tennis by her mother at the age of nine and preferred clay courts. Ashley resides in Ann Arbor, Michigan, and attended Stanford University in 2001.

Teryn married Brian Fitch in August 2008. The couple have a daughter, Abby, and two sons, William and Nico.

Awards
Ashley was a two-time NCAA champion, in 1997 and 1999, and a three-time All-American.

WTA career finals

Doubles: 1 title

ITF Circuit titles

Singles (4–3)

Doubles (12–8)

References

External links
 
 

Living people
1978 births
American female tennis players
Tennis players from Boston
Stanford Cardinal women's tennis players